Unit4 is a software company that designs and delivers enterprise software and ERP applications and related professional services for people in services organizations, with a special focus on the professional services, education, public services, and nonprofit sectors.
It has subsidiaries and offices in 26 countries across Europe, North America, the Asia-Pacific region and Africa.

The company is best known for its People Experience Suite including Unit4 ERP, Unit4 Financials, Unit4 FP&A, Unit4 Talent Management. In 2015, Unit4 announced a partnership with Microsoft to build self-driving business applications on the Microsoft Azure cloud. Unit4's software is available in either cloud or on-premises setups. In 2020, the company launched a Global Channel Partner Programme to aid partners in implementing Unit4 software.

History 

Unit4 was founded in 1980 by Chris Ouwinga and listed on the Amsterdam Stock Exchange in 1998.

In 2000, Unit4 merged with the Norwegian ERP software house Agresso Group ASA and the company name was changed to Unit4Agresso.

In March 2014, Unit4 was acquired by international venture capital firm Advent International.

In 2015, Unit4 rebranded its Coda financial management software package as Unit4 Financials. The Unit4 People Platform was also launched in 2015 as the foundation for Unit4 business applications using Microsoft Azure technology.

In April 2019, Mike Ettling, former president of SAP SuccessFactors and CEO of NGA Human Resources, became Unit4's CEO.

Global growth private equity firm TA Associates announced the strategic growth buy out of Unit4 for more than $2bn in March 2021. Global private markets firm, Partners Group, will invest alongside TA. In April, Unit4 released ERPx, its next-generation intelligent Enterprise Resource Planning (ERP) solution built for mid-market, people-centric organizations.

Acquisitions

Recognition 
Unit4 was featured in Gartner's 2019 Market Guide.

In 2020, Unit4 was featured in a Forrester Wave evaluation of cloud-based HCM suite providers as a Strong Performer. That same year, Unit4 placed 3rd as a Gold Medalist in the ERP Data Quadrant Report on MS Dynamics and Oracle ERP Cloud providers.

In 2021, Unit4 was featured as a Notable Vendor in Gartner’s Market Share Analysis: ERP Software, Worldwide, 2020.

References

External links 

 

Accounting software
Business software companies
Software companies established in 1980
Dutch brands
ERP software companies
Financial software companies
Software companies of the Netherlands
Sliedrecht